Birmingham Business School (BBS) is the business school of the University of Birmingham in England. Originally established as the School of Commerce in 1902, Birmingham Business School is the oldest business school in the United Kingdom.

History and background
In 1901, Sir William Ashley took the first Chair of Commerce at the school, where he fostered the development of its commercial programme. From 1902 until 1923 he served as first Professor of Commerce and Dean of the Faculty, which he was instrumental in founding. 
Ashley said that the aim of the new Faculty was the education not of the "rank and file, but of the officers of the industrial and commercial army: of those who, as principals, directors, managers, secretaries, heads of department, etc., will ultimately guide the business activity of the country".

In its first year, the annual costs of the Faculty, including staff salaries, were £8,200. There were six students, a lecture room and two classrooms. By 1908, fifteen men had graduated from the School.

From 1914 till 1919, University House became a nurses home during World War I. In 1964 the building became a mixed halls of residence until 2002, where it was closed due to the condition of the building and the changing living requirements of students.

In March 2005 University House was officially opened by Sir Dominic Cadbury as the Business School's new £20m home. In 2008, the School expanded to add the Department of Economics to its list of departments that already included Accounting and Finance; Management; Marketing.

A brand new £10m postgraduate teaching centre, the Alan Walters Building officially opened in December 2016.

Research
The 2008 Research Assessment Exercise, in which Birmingham Business School was submitted under the Business and Management Studies sub-panel, 90% of research activity submitted by the School was rated as being of international standing.

At the core of all of the School's research is responsible business and how research can help society; the School has a number of research centres focusing on a range of topics to contribute to this:

Lloyd's Banking Group Centre for Responsible Business 
The interdisciplinary centre, formed in July 2017, is the result of a unique partnership of Birmingham Business School academics, the University of Birmingham Business Engagement team and Lloyds Banking Group.

City Region Economic and Development Institute (City REDI) 
City REDI was established by the University of Birmingham with over £4 million of investment  to support regional economic growth policy and practice through engaged and relevant research. The centre is a research institute focused on developing an academic understanding of major city regions across the globe to develop practical policy which better informs and influences regional and national economic growth policies. Alongside this, the centre is focused on ensuring that the growth of cities is sustainable and beneficial for all. City REDI is involved in the Inclusive Growth Unit, led by the West Midlands Combined Authority.

Centre for Business Strategy and Performance
The Centre for Business Strategy and Performance (CBSP) was established in 1993.

Centre for Crime, Justice and Policing 
The Centre brings together a diverse group of over 40 researchers  who focus on the areas of crime, justice and policing.

Centre on Household Assets and Savings Management (CHASM)

Accountability and Governance Research Cluster 
The Accountability and Governance Research Cluster has three core themes in accountability and governance; tax, public sector and policing. The Centre for Tax Governance examines issues of tax governance from the perspective of social, political, legal and organisational theory. The Public Sector theme focuses on the analysis of the objectives, practices and outcomes of accountability and governance in the context of the Public Sphere. Policing examines accountability with respect to the governance of policing.

The National Audit Office – University of Birmingham Tax Centre

Accreditation and MBA rankings 
The Birmingham MBA has been consistently ranked in the major MBA league tables and it was once ranked the UK's top full-time MBA programme in the Economist Intelligence Unit's 2004 global MBA ranking.

Notable people

Notable alumni
Lord David Currie - Cross Bench Member, House of Lords
David Gill - Chief Executive, Manchester United
Jim Reid-Anderson - President and Chair of Six Flags
David Bailey - Professor of Industrial Strategy at Aston Business School and Vice-Chair of the Regional Studies Association
Simon Mantell - Full-time England field hockey player
James Rodwell - Full-time England rugby sevens player

Deans
The current Dean of Birmingham Business School is Professor Catherine Cassell, who joined in September 2017. Previous Heads of School have included:

Professor Glyn Watson
David Bailey
Jonathan Michie

References

University of Birmingham
Business schools in England